The Development Lotteries Board, also known as DLB, the government's own national lottery organization, was established on January 19, 1983, with great objectives. During the past 39 years, DLB has been able to present many winners whilst marking many turning points in its journey. DLB, during these years, made a tremendous contribution to the enhancement of the education as well as health sectors, giving a true meaning to the money spent by the people of this country on buying lotteries. In the meantime, it labored to change the lives of people in a more positive way.

This institution was established with an investment of Rs. 2.2 million each by the President's Fund and the Mahapola Higher Education Scholarship Trust Fund with the intention of strengthening the financial basis of the President's Fund in accordance with the concept of Mr. Lalith Athulathmudali, when J.R. Jayawardana was the former president. Therefore, DLB still remains as the only public institution that donates the dividends to the President's Fund and Mahapola Higher Education Scholarship Trust Fund. At the commencement, DLB was named as Development Lotteries Center, and then it was transformed into Development Lotteries Trust in 1993. Later, on August 12, 1997, it was again transformed into the Development Lotteries Board by the Development Lotteries Act No. 20 of 1997.

Contribution 
DLB, which is successfully stepping forward, makes its contributions to the President’s Fund and Mahapola Higher Education Scholarship Trust Fund adhering to its main objectives whilst making many developments. Accordingly, DLB could make a contribution of Rs. 2,132,089,178 to the President’s Fund during the period from 1983 up to 2018. In the meantime, the number of scholarships awarded since the establishment of DLB for the higher education of needy students in the country is 289137. Therefore, the service rendered by DLB investing the money spent by people from their pockets can, without any doubt, be highlighted as an unmatched service for the development of the country and people.

Employment 
With all these measures, DLB has provided employment to a large number of people, including 104 District Agents, more than 2500 Sales Agents, and more than 20,000 sales assistants. Therefore, DLB has made a safe platform to live with dignity for more than one hundred thousand, who are dependent on the above employees.  In the meantime, DLB provides employment to more than 300 employees as the staff of the institution, proving its capacity to protect the staff as customers. The decision taken by DLB to provide employment to nearly 550 differently abled people, who are not accepted by most of the institutions in the job market, has brought smiles to these people, giving them an opportunity to live a fruitful life.

History 
DLB marked its entry into the field by introducing instant lotteries to the market in the year 1983. Then it became the first ever lottery in the industry to introduce television draws by television, with the introduction of Shanida Wasana lottery in 1987. At first, the draw was held only on Saturdays, but then it was extended to 7 days in a week. In the second phase, the lottery called Sanwardana Wasana was introduced (it is named as Lagna Wasanawa now) to the market and the draw for it was held on October 9, 1998. It became the second draw held by television media. 

In April 2017, DLB marked another turning point in its journey by issuing Kotipathi Shanida, presenting Rs. 75 million, which was the highest cash award in the history of that time, as its first prize. Today, it has come to the apex as the most popular lottery ticket in DLB.

The Development Lotteries Board marked a significant turning point in its history by way of launching the first digital lottery ‘Sasiri’ under the patronage of S.R. Attygalle, Secretary of the Ministry of Finance. Sasiri is the first digital lottery in South Asia and it can be purchased online through the DLB Sweep App as a soft lottery ticket. Lagna Wasana, Super Ball and Shanida lotteries can also be purchased online through the same App.

Games 
Several games operate under the DLB brand:

Lagna Wasanawa 
Players purchase tickets with four different numbers and one zodiac sign. The lottery draw entry fee is set at Rs. 20 per lottery. The initial jackpot for the Lagana Wasanawa is Rs. 2 million, and it grows by the day if not won.

References 

1983 establishments in Sri Lanka
Lotteries
State owned commercial corporations of Sri Lanka
Lotteries in Sri Lanka